FC Druzhba Arzamas was a Russian football team from Arzamas. It played professionally from 1990 to 1999, including 2 seasons (1995 and 1996) in the second-highest Russian First Division.

Team name history
 1990–1991 Znamya Arzamas
 1992–1999 Torpedo Arzamas
 1999–2001 FC Arzamas
 2002–2004 Druzhba Arzamas

External links
  Team history at KLISF

Association football clubs established in 1990
Association football clubs disestablished in 2005
Defunct football clubs in Russia
Sport in Nizhny Novgorod Oblast
1990 establishments in Russia
2005 disestablishments in Russia